Nicholas Anthony Salvatore (born 1943) is an American historian, and Maurice and Hinda Neufeld Founders Professor of Industrial and Labor Relations and Professor of American Studies at Cornell University.

Life
Salvatore was born in 1943 in the New York City borough of Brooklyn. He graduated from Hunter College in 1968, and graduated from the University of California, Berkeley, with an MA and PhD, where he studied with Leon F. Litwack. 
He has taught American history at the College of the Holy Cross and at Cornell University.

He has two daughters, Gabriella and Nora, and two grandsons, Joseph and Oscar. He and his wife, Ann Sullivan, live in Ithaca, New York.

Awards
 National Endowment for the Humanities fellowships
 Senior Fellow in Residence at the Institute for the Advanced Study of Religion at Yale University.
 Bancroft Prize, for Eugene V. Debs: Citizen and Socialist
 John H. Dunning Prize, for Eugene V. Debs: Citizen and Socialist
 New England History Association's Outstanding Book Prize, for We All Got History

Works
 
 
 
"Biography and Social History : an Intimate Relationship", ''Labour History", November 2008

Edited

References

External links
"Historian's website"
 Nick Salvatore Research Files at the Kheel Center for Labor-Management Documentation and Archives, Cornell University Library

1943 births
20th-century American historians
20th-century American male writers
21st-century American historians
21st-century American male writers
American Christian writers
American male non-fiction writers
Bancroft Prize winners
Christian scholars
Christians from New York (state)
College of the Holy Cross faculty
Cornell University faculty
Historians from New York (state)
Historians of socialism
Hunter College alumni
Labor historians
Living people
University of California, Berkeley alumni
Writers from Brooklyn
Writers from Ithaca, New York